The 2017 Tour de France was the 104th edition of the Tour de France, one of cycling's Grand Tours. The 21-stage race took place across , commencing with an individual time trial in Düsseldorf, Germany on 1 July, and concluding with the Champs-Élysées stage in Paris on 23 July. A total of 198 riders from 22 teams entered the race. Rigoberto Urán and Romain Bardet finished second and third, respectively.

Geraint Thomas won the opening stage and became the Tour's first rider that year to wear the general classification leader's yellow jersey. Froome, who performed the best in the opening stage out of the pre-race favourites, took the lead after the fifth stage's summit finish. He held the lead until it was taken by Fabio Aru at the end of stage twelve, where Froome lost time on the steep summit finish to Peyragudes. Froome retook the yellow jersey after the fourteenth stage and held it until the end of the race.

's Simon Yates, in seventh place overall, won the young rider classification.

Teams

The 2017 edition of the Tour de France consisted of 22 teams. The race was the 25th of the 38 events in the UCI World Tour, and all of its eighteen UCI WorldTeams were entitled, and obliged, to enter the race. The presentation of the teams – where the members of each team's roster are introduced in front of the media and local dignitaries – took place in front of a crowd of 15,000 at the  square in Düsseldorf, Germany, on 29 June, two days before the opening stage held in the city.

Each squad was allowed a maximum of nine riders, resulting in a start list total of 198. Of these, 49 were competing in their first Tour de France. The riders came from 32 countries. Six countries had more than 10 riders in the race: France (39), Italy (18), Belgium (16), Germany (16), the Netherlands (15), and Spain (13). The average age of riders in the race was 29.4 years, ranging from the 22-year-old Élie Gesbert to the 40-year-old Haimar Zubeldia.  had the youngest average age while  had the oldest.

The teams entering the race were:

Pre-race favourites

In the lead up to the 2017 Tour de France, Chris Froome was seen by many pundits as the top pre-race favourite for the general classification. His closest rivals were thought to be Richie Porte, Nairo Quintana, Alberto Contador, Romain Bardet and Fabio Aru. The other riders considered contenders for the general classification were Alejandro Valverde, Jakob Fuglsang, Thibaut Pinot, Esteban Chaves, Geraint Thomas, Dan Martin, Simon Yates, and Louis Meintjes.

Froome, who won the 2013, 2015 and 2016 editions of the Tour, had not won a race in the 2017 season prior to the Tour's start. His best result was fourth overall at the Critérium du Dauphiné, a race considered to be the warm-up for the Tour and one he has won before his three previous Tour victories. Despite this, he was thought to have one of the strongest teams in the race that would ride in total support of him. The 32-year-old Porte, who placed fifth in the 2016 Tour, won the general classification in two stage races so far in 2017, the Tour Down Under and the Tour de Romandie, and came second in the Dauphiné. Quintana, third in the 2016 Tour, placed second at the Giro d'Italia, with overalls wins at the Tirreno–Adriatico and the Volta a la Comunitat Valenciana earlier in the season. The two-time winner (2007 and 2009) 34-year-old Contador came second overall in four stage races in 2017 before the Tour, Paris–Nice, the Vuelta a Andalucía, the Volta a Catalunya and the Tour of the Basque Country. Bardet, the 2016 Tour runner-up, placed sixth overall in the Dauphiné, with his best other result sixth in the one-day Classic race Liège–Bastogne–Liège. Aru started the Tour sharing leadership of the team with the Dauphiné winner Fuglsang. Aru won the Italian National Road Race Championships a week before the Tour and placed fifth at the Dauphiné.

The sprinters considered favourites for the points classification and wins on the flat or hilly bunch sprint finishes were Peter Sagan, Marcel Kittel, Mark Cavendish, André Greipel, and Alexander Kristoff. Others expected to contend for sprint finishes included Michael Matthews, Arnaud Démare, Dylan Groenewegen, John Degenkolb, Sonny Colbrelli and Nacer Bouhanni. Double reigning world road race champion Sagan had won the five previous points classifications of the Tour, one away from matching Erik Zabel's record of six from 1996 to 2001. His form in the 2017 season before the Tour included winning the one-day Kuurne–Brussels–Kuurne race and the points classifications in Tirreno–Adriatico, the Tour de Suisse and the Tour of California. Kittel had gained eight wins so far in 2017, as well as the general and points classifications in the Dubai Tour at the start of the season. Cavendish's season before the Tour was affected by glandular fever, missing around three months; his only success had been a stage win and the points classification at the Abu Dhabi Tour. Greipel had amassed four wins in 2017 before the Tour, including one at the Giro. Kristoff had taken six wins so far in 2017, and the points classifications at the Tour of Oman, the Étoile de Bessèges and the Three Days of De Panne.

Route and stages

The opening stages of the 2017 Tour (known as the Grand Départ) were originally scheduled to be in London, United Kingdom; this would have been the third time the Tour had visited London, following the 2007 and 2014 editions. In September 2015, a week before this was due to be announced, Transport for London pulled out of the bid. It was later revealed that this was the decision of the then Mayor of London, Boris Johnson, on the grounds of cost: hosting the  would have cost £35 million. In December 2015, the ASO announced that the  would take place with stages based in Düsseldorf, the fourth time the Tour had begun in Germany and the first since 1987. The bid to host the Tour was only narrowly approved by the city council. The return to Germany followed a resurgence in German professional cycling. On 14 January 2016, details of the opening two stages were announced. The first stage would be a  individual time trial in Düsseldorf itself. The second stage would also begin in Düsseldorf. The full route was announced by race director Christian Prudhomme on 18 October 2016 at the Palais des Congrès in Paris.

After the first time trial, the race left Germany during stage two, which finished in the Belgian city of Liège. Stage three headed south, and after a brief passage through Luxembourg, ended with a climb in Longwy. After a transitional stage, stage five saw the first major climb, the finish at the La Planche des Belles Filles. The next two stages headed south-west, before stage eight in the Jura Mountains, featured three categorised climbs. After a transfer during the rest day, stage ten took place in the Dordogne region, between Périgueux and Bergerac. Stage eleven was a transitional stage, followed by two stages in the Pyrenees. Stage twelve started from Pau and ended at the Peyragudes ski resort. After leaving the Pyrenees, the riders headed north-east; stage fourteen finished with a climb towards the end of the stage. Stage fifteen featured the first appearance of the Col de Peyra Taillade, with its conclusion in Le Puy-en-Velay. Stage sixteen, the first after the final rest day, was a transitional stage, heading east, towards the Alps. Stage seventeen included the Col d'Ornon, the Col de la Croix de Fer, the Col du Télégraphe and the highest point of elevation in the race, the Col du Galibier, before a descent finish into Serre Chevalier. Stage eighteen was the final day of mountains; it had two climbs, the Col de Vars and the finishing climb, the Col d'Izoard. It was the first time the Tour finished on the -high mountain pass. After another transitional stage, heading south, came stage twenty, a  individual time trial in Marseille. Starting at the Stade Vélodrome, the course headed around the city, designated the 2017 European Capital of Sport, before ending also at the Stade Vélodrome. The final stage began in Montgeron, which hosted the start of the first Tour, before concluding with the traditional laps of the Champs-Élysées.

Of the remaining nineteen stages, eight were officially classified as flat, six as medium mountain and five as high mountain. For the first time since the 1992 edition, the route included all five of mainland France's mountainous regions; the Vosges, the Jura, the Pyrenees, the Massif Central and the Alps. There were summit finishes on stage twelve to Peyragudes and stage eighteen to the Col d'Izoard. Additionally, the hilly stage three had a hilltop finish in Longwy, and stage five ended at La Planche des Belles Filles. The highest point of the race was the -high Col du Galibier mountain pass on stage seventeen. It was among seven hors catégorie (English: "out of category") rated climbs in the race. There were ten new start or finish locations. The rest days were after stage nine, in the Dordogne, and fifteen, in Le Puy-en-Velay.

Race overview

Opening stages, Vosges and Jura

The opening stage's individual time trial was won by Geraint Thomas with a time of 16 min 4 s over the  course. Thomas took the yellow and green jerseys as the leader of the general and points classifications respectively. Chris Froome was the highest placed of the general classification favourites, in sixth place, sixteen seconds down. Overall contender Alejandro Valverde crashed on the wet roads and his injuries forced him to withdraw from the Tour. Marcel Kittel won stage two's bunch sprint, and with it the green jersey. Breakaway rider Taylor Phinney took the first polka dot jersey as the leader of the mountains classification. The uphill sprint finish of stage three was won by Peter Sagan; Nathan Brown took over the polka dot jersey. The fourth stage ended with a bunch sprint and was won by Démare, with him also taking the green jersey. There were two crashes leading up to the finish, the first was in the peloton around  left and the second involved the sprinters at the end. In the sprint finish, Mark Cavendish crashed into the barriers at the side of the road, withdrawing later that day from the race from his injuries. Sagan, second in the stage, was disqualified after race officials judged that he caused Cavendish to crash, with the jury president Philippe Marien saying that he "endangered some of his colleagues seriously".
The near universal opinion among commentators and former riders was that a disqualification is not justified and even senseless. André Greipel, who had criticised Sagan right after the stage, also exonerated him after watching the replays. In December 2017, Sagan was officially exonerated by cycling's governing body, the Union Cycliste Internationale (UCI).

In the fifth stage, a group containing the overall contenders caught the last of the breakaway riders  from the summit finish at the La Planche des Belles Filles. With  remaining, Fabio Aru attacked and won with a margin of sixteen seconds over the group. Thomas lost twenty seconds on the group and lost the yellow jersey to teammate Froome. Aru took over the lead of the mountains classification. Kittel won the following two stages which ended in bunch sprints. The latter stage was decided by a photo finish, with Kittel  ahead of Edvald Boasson Hagen; Kittel regained the green jersey. Calmejane put himself into the polka dot jersey. The ninth stage saw a select group of general classification favourites join Warren Barguil after the final climb of the Mont du Chat and contest a sprint finish, won by Rigoberto Urán. Barguil took lead of the mountains classification. Upon crossing the finish line Barguil thought he won the stage while Uran showed no visible reaction. After a few moments to review the photo finish it was revealed that Uran's 'bike throw' got him over the line first to claim the stage win as Froome sprinted hard to earn a stage podium, but more importantly four bonus seconds to extend his overall lead.
Richie Porte crashed heavily taking down Dan Martin while descending the Mont du Chat within the group of overall contenders. Porte withdrew from the race and was rushed to the hospital; fortunately he was in a stable condition. Dan Martin recovered and finished strongly. The following day was the Tour's first rest day.

Pyrenees and Massif Central

Stages ten and eleven were won from bunch sprints by Kittel, taking his total of wins at the race to five. The twelfth stage saw the overall contenders all reach the foot of the short steep climb to Peyragudes; Romain Bardet won by a margin of two seconds. Froome came seventh, 22 seconds down, and lost the overall lead to third-placed Aru. The -long stage thirteen was won by Barguil, who won the sprint after a descent from an elite group with Nairo Quintana, Alberto Contador and Mikel Landa. The chasing group of overall contenders came in 1 min 39 s down. In the fourteenth stage, a reduced peloton contested the uphill sprint finish at Rodez, which was won by Matthews. Aru's advantage of six seconds over Froome was changed to a deficit of eighteen, after Aru came in thirty seconds down in thirtieth place and Froome was seventh, one second behind Matthews.

In the large group containing the overall contenders, Bardet's team  forced a high pace on the Peyra Taillade. A further  later on the climb, Froome suffered a broken spoke, and, after receiving a new wheel from a teammate and some assistance from three other teammates, he was able to chase back up to the group. The next day was the second rest day of the race. In the sixteenth stage, the high pace set by Matthews's  dropped the green jersey wearer Kittel; Matthews, who was second to Kittel in points classification, won the stage. Primož Roglič, second behind Barguil in the mountains classification, won the following mountainous stage after a solo attack on the Col du Galibier, finishing in Serre Chevalier after a descent over a minute ahead of a four-man group containing the new top three in the general classification: Froome, Urán, and Bardet, respectively; and also Barguil. Aru dropped from second overall to fourth. Kittel crashed and withdrew from the Tour, putting Matthews in the green jersey.

Alps and finale

The final high mountain stage of the Tour, the eighteenth, saw Barguil claim his second stage victory of the race on the summit finish at Col d'Izoard; he was initially caught by the group of overall favourites on the final climb after being the one of last survivors from the breakaway, with only Darwin Atapuma ahead. Barguil's winning move came with  remaining, passing Atapuma to win by twenty seconds. A three-way sprint for fourth place saw Bardet finish just ahead of Froome with Urán placing fifth; Bardet moved up to second overall, six seconds ahead of Urán, with Froome holding a 23-second advantage. Maciej Bodnar of  won the  individual time trial of the penultimate stage, setting a time of 28 min 15 s. Froome was third, six seconds down, increasing his lead in the general classification to 54 seconds. Bardet dropped to third overall after he lost over two minutes in the stage, and Urán was 31 seconds in arrears.

The final stage in Paris was won by Dylan Groenewegen in a bunch sprint on the Champs-Élysées. Froome finished the race to win his fourth Tour de France. Urán placed second overall, 54 seconds down, with Bardet 2 min 20 s behind, just one second ahead of Landa (fourth overall). Matthews won the points classification with a total of 370, 136 ahead of Greipel in second. Barguil won the mountains classification with 169 points, 89 ahead of second-placed Roglič. The best young rider was seventh-placed overall Simon Yates, who was followed by Louis Meintjes (eighth overall) in second, 2 min 6 s down. An  rider won the classification for the second consecutive year, after Yates' twin brother Adam won in 2016.  finished as the winners of the team classification, 7 min 14 s ahead of second-placed . Of the 198 starters, 167 reached the finish of the last stage in Paris.

Classification leadership and minor prizes

There were four main individual classifications being contested in the 2017 Tour de France, as well as a team competition. The most important was the general classification, which was calculated by adding each rider's finishing times on each stage. Time bonuses (time subtracted) were awarded at the end of every stage apart from the two individual time trials. The first three riders get 10, 6, and 4 seconds, respectively. For crashes within the final  of a stage, not including time trials and summit finishes, any rider involved received the same time as the group they were in when the crash occurred. The rider with the lowest cumulative time was the winner of the general classification and was considered to be the overall winner of the Tour. The rider leading the classification wore a yellow jersey.

The second classification was the points classification. Riders received points for finishing among the highest placed in a stage finish, or in intermediate sprints during the stage. The points available for each stage finish were determined by the stage's type. The leader was identified by a green jersey.

The third classification was the mountains classification. Points were awarded to the riders that reached the summit of the most difficult climbs first. The climbs were categorised, in order of increasing difficulty, as fourth-, third-, second-, and first-category and hors catégorie. Double points were awarded on the summit finish of the Col d'Izoard on stage 18. The leader wore a white jersey with red polka dots.

The final individual classification was the young rider classification. This was calculated the same way as the general classification, but the classification was restricted to riders who were born on or after 1 January 1992. The leader wore a white jersey.

The final classification was a team classification. This was calculated using the finishing times of the best three riders per team on each stage; the leading team was the team with the lowest cumulative time. The number of stage victories and placings per team determined the outcome of a tie. The riders in the team that led this classification were identified with yellow number bibs on the back of their jerseys and yellow helmets.

In addition, there was a combativity award given after each stage to the rider considered, by a jury, to have "made the greatest effort and who demonstrated the best qualities of sportsmanship". No combativity awards were given for the time trials and the final stage. The winner wore a red number bib the following stage. At the conclusion of the Tour, Warren Barguil won the overall super-combativity award, again, decided by a jury.

A total of €2,280,950 was awarded in cash prizes in the race. The overall winner of the general classification received €500,000, with the second and third placed riders getting €200,000 and €100,000 respectively. All finishers in the top 160 were awarded with money. The holders of the classifications benefited on each stage they led; the final winners of the points and mountains were given €25,000, while the best young rider and most combative rider collected €20,000. The team classification winners were given €50,000. €11,000 was given to the winners of each stage of the race, with smaller amounts given to places 2–20. There was also a special award with a prize of €5,000, the Souvenir Henri Desgrange, given in honour of Tour founder Henri Desgrange to the first rider to pass the summit of the Col du Galibier. This prize was won by Primož Roglič on stage seventeen.

Final standings

General classification

Points classification

Mountains classification

Young rider classification

Team classification

UCI rankings

Riders from the WorldTeams competing for individually and for their teams for points that contributed towards the World Tour rankings. Riders from both the WorldTeams and Professional Continental teams also competed individually and for their nations for points that contributed towards the UCI World Ranking, which included all UCI road races. Both rankings used the same points scale, awarding points to the top sixty in the general classification, each yellow jersey given at the end of a stage, the top five finishers in each stage and for the top three in the final points and mountains classifications. The points accrued by Chris Froome moved him from twentieth to sixth in the World Tour and kept his fifth place in the World Ranking. Greg Van Avermaet held the lead of both individual rankings.  and Belgium also holding the lead of the World Tour team ranking and World Ranking nation ranking, respectively.

See also

 2017 in men's road cycling
 2017 in sports
 2017 La Course by Le Tour de France

Notes

References

Bibliography

External links

 

 
2017 in Belgian sport
2017 in French sport
2017 in German sport
2017 in Luxembourgian sport
2017 UCI World Tour
July 2017 sports events in France
July 2017 sports events in Germany
July 2017 sports events in Europe
Sports competitions in Düsseldorf
2017
2010s in Düsseldorf